City is a hamlet in Powys, Wales.

Geography

City is just off the minor road that leads from Sarn up to the Kerry Ridgeway and further to Bishop's Castle, a market town  distant, in Shropshire.

At present, 11 dwellings comprise the core of the hamlet (though one is dilapidated) as well as three outlying isolated houses. There are a number of small, disused quarries in the area. Today the landscape is a mixture of woodland and pasture. The local economy is largely based on agriculture and forestry.

There is a Royal Mail post box with a daily collection Monday-Saturday, and the hamlet's postcode is SY16 4HH.

Bachaethlon

A separate and historic settlement called Bachaethlon lies just to the north of City, on the other side of the Sarn-Bishop's Castle road. It consists of 6 dwellings and many agricultural buildings. Anglicised spellings include "Bahaithlon" and "Bahaillon".

Governance
The area forms part of the Kerry community (in the ward of Sarn) and for Powys County Council the electoral division/ward of Kerry. It falls in the historic county of Montgomeryshire.

Origin of the name
The hamlet has never held the status of a city and "City" is not a recognisable Welsh word, so its origin is unclear. It is possible that the name came from an Anglicisation of Saith Tŷ, which is Welsh for "Seven Houses".

There is another place in Wales called City, in the Vale of Glamorgan, as well as City Dulas in Anglesey.

References

Villages in Powys